Wilbur Kookmeyer is the title character of a cartoon strip by Bob Penuelas which first appeared in Surfer magazine in 1986.

Wilbur is a kook, a wanna-be surfer of limited skill.  He wants to be cool, but remains dorky.
Penuelas created Wilbur as a response to cynical commercialism that got into surfing in the early 1980s.

Wilbur started in 1985 as a character in the cartoon Maynard and the Rat in Surfer magazine, and was so popular the strip was renamed.

References 
 Wilbur Kookmeyer official site

External links
'How to draw a cartoon wave the Wilbur Kookmeyer way!' - An art tutorial by Bob Penuelas

Comics characters introduced in 1986
Fictional surfers